Khenejin District is a district (bakhsh) in Farahan County, Markazi Province, Iran. At the 2006 census, its population was 6,956, in 2,075 families.  The District has no cities. The District has one rural district (dehestan): Talkh Ab Rural District.

References 

Farahan County
Districts of Markazi Province